DWIM (936 AM) was a radio station owned and operated by Aliw Broadcasting Corporation. The station's studio and transmitter were located at Brgy. Bayanan II, Calapan.

References

Radio stations established in 1995
Radio stations in Mindoro